The 2008–09 CONCACAF Champions League Championship Round began on 24 February 2009. The draw for the Championship Round was held on 10 December 2008. In each round, teams will play their opponent once at home and once away. The four group winners from the Group Stage will play the second leg at home in the Quarterfinals. The order of the home and away matches for the Semifinals and Finals were determined in the draw.

In all rounds, if two teams are tied after both legs the team with the most away goals is the winner. If the two teams are also tied in away goals, then two fifteen-minute halves of extra time are played. If the two teams are still tied in total goals after extra time, a penalty shootout determines the winner.

Bracket

Quarterfinals 

The first legs of the Quarterfinals were played from 24 February 2009 to 26 February 2009, while the second legs were played from 3 March 2009 to 5 March 2009.

|}

First leg

Second leg 

Atlante won 4–1 on aggregate.

Puerto Rico Islanders won 3–1 on aggregate.

Cruz Azul won 2–0 on aggregate.

Santos Laguna won 5–4 on aggregate.

Semifinals 

The first legs of the Semifinals were played on 17 March and 18 March 2009, while the second legs were played on 7 April and 8 April 2009.

|}

First leg

Second leg 

3–3 on aggregate. Cruz Azul won 4–2 on penalties.

Atlante won 4–3 on aggregate.

Final 

The two-legged final was played on 22 April and 12 May 2009.  The second leg was originally scheduled for 29 April, but was postponed until 12 May by CONCACAF due to concerns over an outbreak of swine flu in Mexico.

|}

First leg

Second leg 

Atlante won 2–0 on aggregate.

Championship Round, 2008-09 Concacaf Champions League